Zinc transporter 1 is a protein which in humans is encoded by the SLC30A1 gene.

Function
SLC30A1 modulates zinc permeation through the L-type calcium channel.  SLC30A1 downregulates not only Zn++ influx, but also Ca++ influx, thereby protecting cells from the effects of excessive cation permeation.

See also
 Solute carrier family

References

Further reading

Solute carrier family